A Fantasy Love Affair is the debut album by Peter Brown. The album was recorded in 1976-77 and released in 1978. It was mastered by Ted Jensen of Sterling Sound.  It charted #9 on Billboard'''s R&B charts and #11 on the Pop chart.  It was successful on the disco charts as well and spawned four singles, three of which were hits, including "Do Ya Wanna Get Funky with Me" and "Dance with Me".
In the UK the album was titled Do You Wanna Get Funky with Me and featured a backlit silhouette of a nude woman standing in a window as its sleeve cover. Brown also photographed the album's somewhat controversial cover and revealed, in a 1978 interview in Rolling Stone'', that he had created the cover's nude model out of cardboard, sheer fabric and ribbons. Until then, no one ever suspected it was not a real person. The album peaked at number 50 in Australia.

The album was later reissued on Collectables Records.

Track listing

Personnel
Peter Brown - lead vocals, synthesizer, guitar, piano, electric piano, drums, percussion, timbales, arrangements
Tom Dziallo - guitar, bass guitar 
Steve Gordon - guitar
Paul Ricupero - guitar, backing vocals
Robert Rans - piano
Michael Smith - alto saxophone
Valerie Von Pechy - harp
Wildflower, Betty Wright, Pat Hurley - backing vocals
Bert Dovo - string and horn arrangements, conductor
Gene Orloff - concertmaster

External links
 Peter Brown-A Fantasy Love Affair at Discogs
 Peter Brown-A Fantasy Love Affair at Allmusic.Com

References

1978 debut albums
Peter Brown (singer) albums